The Big One for One Drop is a $1,000,000 buy-in No Limit Texas hold 'em tournament hosted at the World Series of Poker (WSOP). Added in 2012, it became the highest buy-in poker tournament in history as well as the largest single payout offered. The event is known for its charitable contributions, as $111,111 or €111,111 of each player's buy in is donated to the One Drop Foundation, an international non-profit organization created by Cirque du Soleil founder Guy Laliberté, which focuses on water initiatives.

History
Canadian entrepreneur Guy Laliberté started the Big One for One Drop in 2012 as a No-Limit hold 'em event hosted at the World Series of Poker. He founded the nonprofit One Drop Foundation, which seeks unconditional access to safe drinking water in crisis areas. Buy-ins range from $111,111 for the high roller event to $1,000,000 for the Big One or €1,000,000 for the spin off Monte-Carlo One Drop Extravaganza event hosted in Europe. 3.5% of the prize pool benefits the One Drop Foundation. The event was hosted at the WSOP in 2014. A smaller event known as the "High Roller for One Drop" hosted in 2013, 2015, 2016 and 2017 has a buy in of $111,111 with $11,111 going toward charity.

Antonio Esfandiari won the first event defeating Sam Trickett heads-up and earned $18,346,673. In 2013, the following year, the WSOP hosted the lower buy-in $111,111 High Roller event, won by Anthony Gregg. Gregg defeated Chris Klodnicki heads up and earned $4,830,619.

In 2014, the $1,000,000 Big One returned. The final table consisted of professional players such as Dan Colman, Daniel Negreanu, Christoph Vogelsang, Tobias Reinkemeier and Scott Seiver as well as recreational players Paul Newey, Cary Katz and Rick Salomon. Colman won the tournament defeating Negreanu heads up and earned $15,306,668.

From 2015 to 2017, One Drop only offered the lower $111,111 High Roller event at the WSOP with Jonathan Duhamel, Fedor Holz and Doug Polk winning each event respectively.

In October 2016, the Big One for One Drop Extravaganza returned at a new venue held in Monte Carlo. The buy-in was €1,000,000 and opened only to recreational players. Canadian Chinese poker player Elton Tsang won the event for €11,111,111 after defeating Anatoly Gurtovoy of Russia heads up.

In November 2017, it was announced that the $1,000,000 buy-in event would return to the 2018 World Series of Poker. 27 players entered for a total prizepool of $24,840,000, and $80,000 from each buy-in donated to the One Drop foundation for a total of $2,160,000.

Results

* Note that this event did not award a bracelet to the winner.

2012 Big One for One Drop
 3-Day Event: July 1–3
 Buy-in: $1,000,000
 Number of Entries: 48
 Total Prize Pool: $42,666,672
 Number of Payouts: 9
 Winning Hand:

2013 High Roller for One Drop
 4-Day Event: June 26–29
 Buy-in: $111,111
 Number of Entries: 166
 Total Prize Pool: $17,891,148
 Number of Payouts: 24
 Winning Hand:

2014 Big One for One Drop
 3-Day Event: June 29–July 1
 Buy-in: $1,000,000
 Number of Entries: 42
 Total Prize Pool: $37,333,338
 Number of Payouts: 8
 Winning Hand:

2015 High Roller for One Drop
 2-Day Event: June 28–29
 Buy-in: $111,111
 Number of Entries: 135
 Total Prize Pool: $14,249,925
 Number of Payouts: 16
 Winning Hand:

2016 High Roller for One Drop
 3-Day Event: July 8–10
 Buy-in: $111,111
 Number of Entries: 183
 Total Prize Pool: $19,316,565
 Number of Payouts: 28
 Winning Hand:

2016 Monte-Carlo One Drop Extravaganza
 3-Day Event: October 14–16
 Buy-in: €1,000,000
 Number of Entries: 28 (2 rebuys)
 Total Prize Pool: $27,437,564
 Number of Payouts: 6
 Winning Hand:

2017 High Roller for One Drop
 4-Day Event: June 2–5
 Buy-in: $111,111
 Number of Entries: 130
 Total Prize Pool: $13,722,150
 Number of Payouts: 20
 Winning Hand:

2018 Big One for One Drop
 3-Day Event: July 15–17
 Buy-in: $1,000,000
 Number of Entries: 27
 Total Prize Pool: $24,840,000
 Number of Payouts: 5
 Winning Hand:

References

External links
 

World Series of Poker
Poker tournaments